Rafael Marín Zamora (born 19 May 2002) is a Spanish professional footballer who plays as a centre-back for Real Madrid Castilla. He is a youth international for Spain.

Club career

Real Madrid Castilla 
Marín made his debut for the Castilla side on 2 May 2021, coming on as a substitute in a 3–1 win over Badajoz. He would later be called up to the senior team for the first time on 22 December 2021, spending the entirety of the match on the bench in a 2–1 victory at Athletic Bilbao in La Liga.

Career statistics

References

External links 

 Real Madrid Profile
 
 
 

Living people
2002 births
Footballers from Seville
Spanish footballers
Association football defenders
Segunda División B players
Primera Federación players
Real Madrid Castilla footballers
Spain youth international footballers